Michel Patryr (born 16 January 1953) is a Swiss athlete. He competed in the men's high jump at the 1972 Summer Olympics.

References

1953 births
Living people
Athletes (track and field) at the 1972 Summer Olympics
Swiss male high jumpers
Olympic athletes of Switzerland
Place of birth missing (living people)